Nemsdorf-Göhrendorf is a municipality in the Saalekreis district, Saxony-Anhalt, Germany.
It is the seat of the Verbandsgemeinde ("collective municipality") Weida-Land.

References

Saalekreis